Hans Gildemeister and Andrés Gómez were the defending champions, but none competed this year.

Rick Leach and Tim Pawsat won the title by defeating Mikael Pernfors and Magnus Tideman 6–3, 6–4 in the final.

Seeds
All seeds received a bye into the second round.

Draw

Finals

Top half

Bottom half

References

External links
 Official results archive (ATP)
 Official results archive (ITF)

Stuttgart Doubles
Doubles 1987